Chiapa de Corzo may refer to:
Chiapa de Corzo (Mesoamerican site), a Mesoamerican archaeological site located in the Chiapas highlands, Mexico
Chiapa de Corzo, Chiapas, the modern township and municipality, central Chiapas, Mexico